Duster is an album by vibraphonist Gary Burton that was recorded in 1967 and released by RCA. It features Burton with electric guitarist Larry Coryell, bassist Steve Swallow and legendary drummer Roy Haynes.

Duster is considered one of the first jazz fusion albums. It peaked at number 15 on Billboard magazine's Top Jazz Albums.

Reception 

The Allmusic review by Scott Yanow described it as "one of the first fusion records", also stating: "Although Burton's basic sound had not changed from the previous year, his openness toward other styles made his Quartet one of the most significant jazz groups of the period".

Track listing 
All compositions by Mike Gibbs except where indicated.
 "Ballet" – 4:54
 "Sweet Rain" – 4:24
 "Portsmouth Figurations" (Steve Swallow) – 3:03
 "General Mojo's Well Laid Plan" (Swallow) – 4:58
 "One, Two, 1-2-3-4" (Gary Burton, Larry Coryell) – 5:56
 "Sing Me Softly of the Blues" (Carla Bley) – 4:05
 "Liturgy" – 3:26
 "Response" (Burton) – 2:15

Personnel 

Musicians
 Gary Burton – vibraphone
Larry Coryell – guitar
Steve Swallow – double bass
Roy Haynes – drums

Production
 Donald Elfman – liner notes, reissue producer
 Ray Hall – engineer
 Brad McCuen – producer
 Thomas Molesky – cover design
 Tom Zimmerman – photography
 Mike Zwerin – liner notes

Chart history

References 

 

RCA Records albums
Gary Burton albums
1967 albums